The BC Geographical Names (formerly BC Geographical Names Information System or BCGNIS) is a geographic name web service and database for the Canadian province of British Columbia run by the Base Mapping and Geomatic Services Branch of the Integrated Land Management Bureau. The database contains official names and spellings of towns, mountains, rivers, lakes, and other geographic places. The database often has other useful information, such as the history of geographic names, and their use in history.

External links
 

Geocodes
Names of places in Canada
Internet databases